Martina Thörn (born 21 February 1991) is a Swedish handball player for Odense Håndbold and the Swedish national team.

She represented Sweden at the 2019 World Women's Handball Championship.

References

External links

1991 births
Living people
Swedish female handball players
Expatriate handball players
Swedish expatriate sportspeople in Denmark
Swedish expatriate sportspeople in Norway
Sportspeople from Västerås
FCM Håndbold players